is a railway station in Kyōtanabe, Kyoto, Japan.

It is located near the entrance to the Kyōtanabe campuses of Doshisha University, Doshisha Women's College of Liberal Arts, and Doshisha International Junior Senior High School, hence the name of the station, which literally means "before" or "in front of" Doshisha.

Lines
West Japan Railway Company (JR West)
Katamachi Line (Gakkentoshi Line)

Stations next to Dōshishamae

History 
Station numbering was introduced in March 2018 with Dōshishamae being assigned station number JR-H23.

Surrounding area
Kodo Station (Kyoto)
It takes about 5 minutes from here on foot.

References

External links

Official Website

Railway stations in Kyoto Prefecture
Railway stations in Japan opened in 1986